Eye movement desensitization and reprocessing (EMDR) is a form of psychotherapy developed by Francine Shapiro in the 1980s that was originally designed to alleviate the distress associated with traumatic memories such as post-traumatic stress disorder (PTSD). EMDR adds a number of non-scientific practices, like finger tapping, to exposure therapy and has been aggressively promoted for the treatment of PTSD. It has been characterized as a pseudoscience and is only as effective as its underlying therapeutic methods without EMDR's distinctive add-ons.

The 2013 World Health Organization (WHO) practice guideline states that EMDR "is based on the idea that negative thoughts, feelings, and behaviors are the result of unprocessed memories. The treatment involves standardized procedures that include focusing simultaneously on spontaneous associations of traumatic images, thoughts, emotions and bodily sensations and bilateral stimulation that is most commonly in the form of repeated eye movements."

EMDR is included in several evidence-based guidelines for the treatment of PTSD, with varying levels of recommendation and evidence (very low to moderate per WHO stress guidelines).

Method 
EMDR adds a number of non-scientific practices to exposure therapy and is provided over the course of several sessions.

Formal EMDR therapy consists of eight phases. The first phase includes history taking and treatment planning. The second phase includes preparation. The third phase is an assessment phase followed by the fourth phase of desensitization. Phases 5 and 6 involve installing positive cognitions and 'body scan". The last phase is the reevaluation phase. EMDR is typically undertaken in a series of sessions with a trained therapist. The number of sessions can vary depending on the progress made. A typical EMDR therapy session lasts from 60 to 90 minutes.

Medical uses

Trauma and PTSD 
The person being treated is asked to recall an image, phrase, and emotions that represent a level of distress related to a trigger while generating one of several types of bilateral sensory input, such as side-to-side eye movements or hand tapping. The 2013 World Health Organization practice guideline says that "Like cognitive behavioral therapy (CBT) with a trauma focus, EMDR aims to reduce subjective distress and strengthen adaptive beliefs related to the traumatic event. Unlike CBT with a trauma focus, EMDR does not involve (a) detailed descriptions of the event, (b) direct challenging of beliefs, (c) extended exposure or (d) homework."

Effectiveness 
Unusually for interventions that are considered pseudoscientific, EMDR has been subject to a number of randomized controlled trials. It has been called a purple hat therapy because its effectiveness stems from the underlying therapy, not from is distinctive features. 

While multiple meta-analyses have found EMDR to be as effective as trauma focused cognitive behavioral therapy (TF-CBT) for the treatment of PTSD, these findings have been regarded as tentative given the low numbers in the studies, high-risk rates of researcher bias, and high dropout rates.

 A Cochrane systematic review comparing EMDR with other psychotherapies in the treatment of Chronic PTSD found EMDR to be just as effective as TF-CBT and more effective than the other non-TF-CBT psychotherapies. Caution was urged interpreting the results due to low numbers in included studies, risk of researcher bias, high drop-out rates, and overall "very low" quality of evidence for the comparisons with other psychotherapies.

 A 2016 systematic review and meta-analysis found that the effect size of EMDR for PTSD is comparable to other evidence-based treatments, but that the strength of evidence was of a low quality, indicating that the effect sizes achieved are associated with substantial uncertainty.

 A 2020 systematic review and meta-analysis was the "first systematic review of randomized trials examining the effects of EMDR for any mental health problem." The authors raised concerns about bias in previous studies, concluding:

Position statements 
The 2009 International Society for Traumatic Stress Studies practice guidelines categorized EMDR as an evidence-based level A treatment for PTSD in adults. Other guidelines recommending EMDR therapy – as well as CBT and exposure therapy – for treating trauma have included NICE starting in 2005, Australian Centre for Posttraumatic Mental Health in 2007, the Dutch National Steering Committee Guidelines Mental Health and Care in 2003, the American Psychiatric Association in 2004, the Departments of Veterans Affairs and Defense in 2010, SAMHSA in 2011, the International Society for Traumatic Stress Studies in 2009, and the World Health Organization in 2013 (only for PTSD, not for acute stress treatment). The American Psychological Association "conditionally recommends" EMDR for the treatment of PTSD.

Children 
EMDR is included in a 2009 practice guideline for helping children who have experienced trauma. EMDR is often cited as a component in the treatment of complex post-traumatic stress disorder.

Other conditions 

Several small studies have indicated EMDR efficacy for other mental health conditions.

Depression
Studies have indicated EMDR effectiveness in depression. A 2019 review found that "Although the selected studies are few and with different methodological critical issues, the findings reported by the different authors suggest in a preliminary way that EMDR can be a useful treatment for depression."

Anxiety related disorders
Small studies have found EMDR to be effective with generalized anxiety disorder, obsessive-compulsive disorder, other anxiety disorders, and distress due to body image issues.

Dissociative identity disorder
EMDR has been found to cause strong effects on dissociative identity disorder patients, causing recommendations for adjusted use.

Other conditions
Studies have investigated EMDR therapy's efficacy with borderline personality disorder, and somatic disorders such as phantom limb pain. EMDR has also been found to improve stress management symptoms. EMDR has been found to reduce suicidal ideation, and help low self-esteem. Other studies focus on effectiveness in substance craving and pain management.

Reviews

A 2013 overall literature review covered research up to that time.

A 2020 systematic review and meta-analysis was the "first systematic review of randomized trials examining the effects of EMDR for any mental health problem." The authors concluded: "it is evident that the long-term effects of EMDR are unclear, and... there is certainly not enough evidence to advise its use in patients with mental health problems other than PTSD."

Mechanism

Possible mechanisms

Incomplete processing of experiences in trauma
Many proposals of EMDR efficacy share an assumption that, as Shapiro posited, when a traumatic or very negative event occurs, information processing of the experience in memory may be incomplete. The trauma causes a disruption of normal adaptive information processing, which results in unprocessed information being dysfunctionally held in memory networks. According to the 2013 World Health Organization practice guideline: "This therapy [EMDR] is based on the idea that negative thoughts, feelings and behaviours are the result of unprocessed memories."

EMDR allowing correct processing of memories
EMDR is posited to help in the correct processing of the components of the contributing distressing memories. EMDR may allow the client to access and reprocess negative memories (leading to decreased psychological arousal associated with the memory). This is sometimes known as the Adaptive Information Processing (AIP) model.

Proposed mechanisms by which EMDR achieves efficacy
The mechanism EMDR proposes are non science-based. Several possible mechanisms have been posited;

 EMDR may impact working memory. If a patient performs bilateral stimulation task while remembering the trauma, the amount of information they can recall is reduced, which makes the resulting negative emotions less intense, and more bearable. This is seen by some as a 'distancing effect'. The client is then able to re-evaluate the trauma and to process it correctly. 
 EMDR may enable ‘dual attention’ in which the trauma is recalled while also remaining aware of the present. 
 Horizontal eye movement triggers an evolutionary 'orienting response' in the brain, used in scanning the environment for threats and opportunities.
 EMDR gives an effect similar to the effects of sleep, and posit that traumatic experiences are processed during sleep.
 Trauma can be overcome or mastered, and EMDR facilitates a form of mindfulness or other forms of mastery over the trauma.

A 2013 meta-analysis focused on two mechanisms: (1) taxing working memory and (2) orienting response/REM sleep.

It may be that several mechanisms are at work in EMDR.

Bilateral stimulation, including eye movement

Bilateral stimulation is a generalization of the left and right repetitive eye movement technique first used by Shapiro. Alternative stimuli include auditory stimuli that alternate between left and right speakers or headphones and physical stimuli such as tapping of the therapist's hands or tapping devices. Research has attempted to correlate other types of rhythmic side-to-side stimuli, such as sound and touch, with mood, memory, and cerebral hemispheric interaction.
Francine Shapiro noticed that eye movements appeared to decrease the negative emotion associated with her own distressing memories. Bilateral stimulation seems to cause dissipation of emotions.
Research results and opinions have been mixed on the effectiveness and importance of the technique;

 A 2000 review found that the eye movements did not play a central role, and that the mechanisms of eye movements were speculative. 
 A 2001 meta-analysis suggested that EMDR with the eye movements was no more efficacious than EMDR without the eye movements (Davidson & Parker, 2001). 
 A 2002 review reported that the eye movement is irrelevant, and that the effectiveness of EMDR was solely due to its having properties similar to CBT, such as desensitization and exposure. 
 A 2012 review found that the evidence provided support for the contention that eye movements are essential to this therapy and that a theoretical rationale exists for their use.
 A 2013 meta-study found the effect size of eye movement was large and significant, with the strongest effect size difference being for vividness measures. 
 A 2020 systematic review and meta-analysis including nine dismantling randomized controlled trials of EMDR with or without bilateral eye-movements found that the efficacy between EMDR with and without eye-movements were negligible to non-existent. 
2020 research showed that bilateral alternating stimulation caused a significant increase in connectivity between several areas of the brain, including the two superior temporal gyri, the precuneus, the middle frontal gyrus and a set of structures involved in multisensory integration, executive control, emotional processing, salience and memory.
 A 2020 review questioned the consistency and generalizability of the technique.

Criticisms 

EMDR is controversial within the psychological community.

Effectiveness and theoretical basis
Concerns have included questions about its effectiveness and the importance of the eye movement component of EMDR. In 2012, Hal Arkowitz and Scott Lilienfeld summed up the state of the research at the time, and stated that while EMDR was better than no treatment and probably better than merely talking to a supportive listener, there was no good evidence that EMDR was better than exposure-based treatments.

A systematic review from 2021 found that client perceptions of effectiveness were also mixed.

Pseudoscience
EMDR has been characterized as pseudoscience, because the underlying theory is unfalsifiable. Also, the results of the therapy are non-specific, especially if the eye movement component is irrelevant to the results. What remains is a broadly therapeutic interaction and deceptive marketing. According to Yale neurologist Steven Novella:

Excessive training
Shapiro has been criticized for repeatedly increasing the length and expense of training and certification, allegedly in response to the results of controlled trials that cast doubt on EMDR's efficacy. This included requiring the completion of an EMDR training program in order to be qualified to administer EMDR properly after researchers using the initial written instructions found no difference between no-eye-movement control groups and EMDR-as-written experimental groups. Further changes in training requirements and/or the definition of EMDR included requiring level II training when researchers with level I training still found no difference between eye-movement experimental groups and no-eye-movement controls and deeming "alternate forms of bilateral stimulation" (such as finger-tapping) as variants of EMDR by the time a study found no difference between EMDR and a finger-tapping control group. Such changes in definition and training for EMDR have been described as "ad hoc moves [made] when confronted by embarrassing data".

History 
Exposure therapy began in the 1950s, when South African psychologists and psychiatrists used it to reduce pathological fears.
They then brought their methods to England in the Maudsley Hospital training program.
Since the 1950s several sorts of exposure therapy have been developed, including systematic desensitization, flooding, implosive therapy, prolonged exposure therapy, in vivo exposure therapy, and imaginal exposure therapy.

EMDR therapy was first developed by American psychologist Francine Shapiro after noticing, in 1987, that eye movements appeared to decrease the negative emotion associated with her own distressing memories. She then conducted a scientific study with trauma victims in 1988 and the research was published in the Journal of Traumatic Stress in 1989. Her hypothesis was that when a traumatic or distressing experience occurs, it may overwhelm normal coping mechanisms, with the memory and associated stimuli being inadequately processed and stored in an isolated memory network.

Shapiro noted that, when she was experiencing a disturbing thought, her eyes were involuntarily moving rapidly. She further noted that her anxiety was reduced when she brought her eye movements under voluntary control while thinking a traumatic thought. Shapiro developed EMDR therapy for post-traumatic stress disorder (PTSD). She speculated that traumatic events "upset the excitatory/inhibitory balance in the brain, causing a pathological change in the neural elements".

See also
 Treatments for PTSD
 List of topics characterized as pseudoscience

References 

Anxiety disorder treatment
Counseling
Psychotherapies
Pseudoscience